Mighty Gunners is a football club in Otjiwarongo, Namibia. It plays in the Namibia Premier League and in Mokati Stadium. The club is formed up by members of the Namibian Army's 4 Artillery Brigade (Namibia) based in Otjiwarongo.

References

Football clubs in Namibia
Namibia Premier League clubs
Otjiwarongo